Juan Ramòn Salgado Caves (1961-May 2, 2006) was a Liberal politician from Honduras. He was fatally shot by an unknown gunman. 

Salgado served as the deputy leader of the governing Liberal Party and was also the mayor of Trujillo.

1961 births
Salgado, Juam Ramon
Salgado, Juam Ramon
Assassinated Honduran politicians
People murdered in Honduras
Mayors of places in Honduras
Liberal Party of Honduras politicians